American Middle Class is the debut solo album by Angaleena Presley, released on October 14, 2014, through Slate Creek Records.

Critical reception

American Middle Class received highly positive reviews from music critics. At Metacritic, which assigns a normalized rating out of 100 to reviews from mainstream critics, the album has an average score of 84 out of 100, which indicates "universal acclaim" based on nine reviews.

In a four out of five star review Stephen Thomas Erlewine of AllMusic writes that the album "will linger for some time to come." In the three and a half out of five star review from Rolling Stones Jonathan Bernstein, he remarks how it is an "impressive solo debut". There was a four star rating granted to the album from Neil Spencer of The Observer, where he revealed he felt "Presley's vocal and lyrical touch are exceptional on an impressive state-of-the-nation album." At The Daily Telegraph, Martin Chilton believes "the musicianship is top notch." The four star review delivered from Billboards Elias Leight is for "a focused collection of songs." The Uncut magazine rated the album an eight out of ten because "Presley has a wry, modern take on country music." In Cuepoint, Robert Christgau called it a "moderately astonishing bunch of songs" on which "she sings pretty as you please." The eight out of ten rating bestowed on the release from Anthony Easton at PopMatters is in response to "the corruption and failure of the market rotting from the bottom and squeezing from the top, is profoundly realized here." Stuart Henderson rates the album a nine out of ten for Exclaim! because "this debut is about as accomplished as one could reasonably expect." The Tampa Bay Times grants the release an A, and Sean Daly sees how "she has a persistent knack for showmanship, small scenes but grand gestures." Nate Chinen of The New York Times declares "American Middle Class, (Presley's) debut album, comes fully formed, clear about its purpose."

The album was nominated for "International Album of the Year" by the UK Americana Music Association.

Track listing

Personnel
Credits adapted from AllMusic.

Musicians
 Kelly Archer – background vocals
 Aden Bubeck – bass guitar, upright bass
 Fred Eltringham – bottle, castanets, drums, pans, shaker
 Audley Freed – Dobro, 12-string electric guitar, electric guitar, mandolin
 Kevin Gates – banjo, bouzouki, dobro, acoustic guitar, electric guitar, mandolin, background vocals
 Josh Grange – steel guitar
 David Henry – cello, violin

 Patty Loveless – background vocals (track 4)
 Gayle Mayes – background vocals
 Angaleena Presley – lead vocals
 Angela Primm – background vocals
 Emily Saliers – background vocals
 Sarah Siskind – background vocals
 Chris Stapleton – background vocals (track 6)
 John Henry Trinko – Hammond B-3 organ, keyboards, Wurlitzer
 Glenn Worf – bass guitar, upright bass

Technical personnel
 Sarah Barlow – photography
 Charlie Brocco – engineer, mixing
 Brad Henderson – art direction
 Kam Luchterhand – assistant engineer, mixing assistant
 Taylor Pollert – engineer
 Jordan Powell – producer
 Angaleena Presley – producer
 Stephen Schofield – photography

Chart performance

References

2014 debut albums
Angaleena Presley albums